Nicotine is the debut studio album by American singer Trevor Daniel. It was released on March 26, 2020, by Alamo and Interscope Records.

Track listing 
Credits adapted from Apple Music and Tidal.

Charts

References 

2020 debut albums
Trevor Daniel (singer) albums
Albums produced by Finneas O'Connell
Interscope Records albums